Bloody Marie is a 2019 Dutch drama film directed by Guido van Driel and Lennert Hillege and starring Susanne Wolff. In July 2019, it was shortlisted as one of the nine films in contention to be the Dutch entry for the Academy Award for Best International Feature Film at the 92nd Academy Awards, but it was not selected.

Cast
 Susanne Wolff as Marie Wankelmut
 Dragos Bucur as Dragomir
 Alexia Lestiboudois as Iliana
 Teun Luijkx as Ferry
 Jan Bijvoet as Oscar
 Mark Rietman as Jos
 Aart Staartjes as Neighbour
 Murth Mossel as Lucas

Production 

In January 2018 it was announced that Mark Rietman, Teun Luijkx, Aart Staartjes and Murth Mossel were added to the cast.

References

External links
 

2019 films
2019 drama films
Dutch drama films
2010s Dutch-language films
2010s English-language films
2019 multilingual films
Dutch multilingual films